Irvy (Igle) Gledhill is a South African physicist at the University of Witwatersrand, School of Mechanical, Industrial & Aeronautical Engineering, in Johannesburg.

Education 
She has her bachelor's degree in physics, chemistry, and applied maths from Rhodes University in 1976 and an honours in Physics, 1977. She earned her PhD in plasma physics in 1983 from the University of Natal. Her research topic was Ion Acoustic Waves in Multi-Species Plasmas. She did postdocs at the University of California, Los Angeles in thermonuclear fusion, and in Space Shuttle-related plasma simulation at Stanford University's Space, Telecommunications and Radioscience Lab (STARLab).

Career 
Early in her career she modelled plasma behavior at the temperatures of the stars, and plasma fusion, and why galaxies are galaxy-shaped.

Starting in 1987, Dr. Gledhill worked as a fellow in the Defense Technology Operational Unit (Defencetek, later Defence, Peace, Safety and Security) of the Council for Scientific and Industrial Research (CSIR) South Africa. She specialized in transonic aerodynamics at Defencetek’s Aeronautics Programme, using computational fluid dynamics (CFD). She also had a role in some of CSIR's strategic initiatives.

From 2000-2004, Dr. Gledhill served on South Africa's National Research Foundation panels. She was President of the South African Council for Automation and Computation from 1995 to 1996. From 2000-2008, she served as President of the South African Association for Theoretical and Applied Mechanics and Chair of the South African National Committee for International Union of Theoretical and Applied Mechanics (IUTAM). From 2006-2012, she was a member of IUTAM Working Party 9 on Education and Capacity Building. She was a member of the Advisory Panel on Control Systems in Competitive Industry for National Research Foundation (NRF) and of the International Panel on Shaping the future of physics in South Africa, a process for review and foresight developed by the South African Institute of Physics (SAIP), the Department of Science and Technology (DST), and the NRF. She became President of the South African Institute of Physics in 2013.

She was Chair of the Working Group on Women in Physics for the International Union of Pure and Applied Physics from 2014 to 2017, and is a member of the Executive of the Collaborative Project on the Gender Gap in Science funded by the International Science Council. She joined the Interdisciplinary Committee of the World Cultural Council in 2015.

Currently she is the Visiting Adjunct Professor in Flow Physics at the University of Witwatersrand and is Editor-in-Chief for African Physics Newsletter.

Awards and honors 
 1994 President, South African Council for Automation and Computation 
 2004 Award for Transformation, as a member of CFD Team: CSIR Defencetek “Assegai”  
 2009 Career Achievement Award, Defence, Peace, Safety and Security Operational Unit, CSIR
 2013-2015 President, South African Institute of Physics
 2012-present Member of Council, South African Council for Natural Scientific Professionals
 2008-2010 Chair, CSIR Strategic Research Panel 
2014-2017 Chair, IUPAP Working Group on Women in Physics
2015 Member, World Cultural Council Interdisciplinary Committee
2019-present Ambassador for Women in Physics in South Africa, South African Institute of Physics
2019 Vice-President for International Relations and Scientific Affairs, Network of African Science Academies

She is a member of the Academy of Science of South Africa, the South African Institute of Physics, and Sigma Xi, and is a registered Professional Scientist.

References

External links 
 
 

Living people
21st-century South African physicists
Rhodes University alumni
University of Natal alumni
University of California, Los Angeles faculty
Stanford University faculty
Academic staff of the University of the Witwatersrand
1957 births